Joseph Bean (16 February 1876 – 12 January 1922) was an English cricketer active from 1895 to 1903 who played for Sussex. He was born and died in Sutton-in-Ashfield. He appeared in 40 first-class matches, scoring 453 runs with a highest score of 46 and taking 35 wickets with a best performance of five for 34.

Notes

1876 births
1922 deaths
English cricketers
Sussex cricketers
Cricketers from Sutton-in-Ashfield